Zhang Anzhi (1911 - 1991) was a Chinese painter and Olympian who competed in the art competitions at the 1948 Summer Olympics in London.

Life 
Zhang Anzhi graduated from Nanjing Central University in 1931, under the guidance of Xu Beihong, and later Lü Fengzi, and continued his studies in 1946 at the University of London. In 1948, he took part in the Olympics, and was later admitted as professor and taught at the Central Academy of Fine Arts in Beijing. He died in 1991, aged 80.

Publications 
 A History of Chinese Painting, 1992, a year after his death

References 

1911 births
1991 deaths
Painters from Yangzhou
Republic of China painters
Summer Olympics competitors for China
Educators from Yangzhou
Olympic competitors in art competitions